Girl's Dorm is the debut studio album by Taiwanese Mandopop girl group S.H.E, released by HIM International Music on 11 September 2001.

This album is the only one in which each member has her own solos: Hebe's solos were "Someone Loves You Instead of Me" and "Too Much", Selina's "Forgotten to Forget About You", and Ella's was "Don't". Labelmates Power Station composed the songs "Fridge" and "Are You All Right". Three of the songs in this album ("Beauty Up Me", "Too Much" and "He Is") would be used to endorse Wacoal, SoGo and Digimaster, respectively. Most of the lyrics in this album were written by Wu Hsiung; from Youth Society onwards, most of the lyrics are by Shi Rencheng. The music video for "戀人未滿" (Not Yet Lovers) features Taiwanese actor Joseph Chang. "Not Yet Lovers" is a translated cover of "Brown Eyes" by Destiny's Child from their 2001 studio album Survivor, with Beyoncé and Walter Afanasieff credited as co-writers.

The track "戀人未滿" (Not Yet Lovers) is listed at number 3 on Hit Fm Taiwan's Hit Fm Annual Top 100 Singles Chart (Hit-Fm年度百首單曲) for 2001.

S.H.E was nominated for Best New Artist at the 13th Golden Melody Awards in 2002 for their work on this album.

Track listing

Music videos
The karaoke VCD included fully choreographed music videos for "Not Yet Lovers", "Beauty Up My Life", "Fridge", and "Too Much." The videos for "Are You All Right" and "He is Him" were essentially edited footage of S.H.E singing those respective songs. "戀人未滿" (Not Yet Lovers) is a story of three girls (Selina, Hebe, and Ella) fawning over the same boy (Joseph Chang), but deciding that their friendship is evidently more valuable.

References

External links
  S.H.E discography@HIM International Music

2001 albums
S.H.E albums
HIM International Music albums